Akshay Ramachandran Chandran (born 19 October 1993) is an Indian cricketer who plays for Kerala in domestic cricket. He is an all-rounder who bats left-handed and bowls slow left arm orthodox.

Domestic career
After representing Kerala in U-14, U-16, U-19, U-22 and U-25 levels, Akshay made his first-class debut for Kerala in the 2014-15 Ranji Trophy on 29 January 2015 against Services. He didn't create much impact in the first innings but came back with a fifer in the second. He scored his maiden century against Services in the 2016-17 Ranji Trophy scoring an unbeaten 102*.

During the 2017-18 Ranji Trophy he was reported for suspect action during Kerala's win against Rajasthan and wasn't able to take any further part in the campaign. However re-modeled his bowling action and returned to competitive cricket the next season through Vijay Hazare Trophy and claimed nine wickets from his first three matches.

He made his List A debut for Kerala in the 2018–19 Vijay Hazare Trophy on 19 September 2018 against Andhra Pradesh. He made his Twenty20 debut on 14 November 2019, for Kerala in the 2019–20 Syed Mushtaq Ali Trophy against Vidarbha.

References

External links
 

1993 births
Living people
Indian cricketers
Kerala cricketers
Cricketers from Kochi